The 1935 Wightman Cup was the 13th edition of the annual women's team tennis competition between the United States and Great Britain. It was held at the West Side Tennis Club in Forest Hills, Queens in New York City in the United States.

See also
 1935 Davis Cup

References

1935
1935 in tennis
1935 in American tennis
1935 in British sport
1935 in women's tennis